is a Japanese manga written and illustrated by Yutta Narukami. It was published by Ohzora Publishing in Japan in October 2006, and released by Aurora Publishing in English in July 2008.

Reception
Johanna Draper Carlson described the protagonist as "wishy-washy", and felt the faces of the characters were "generic".  Sam Kusek felt that the stories were not just about sex.

References

External links

Aurora Publishing (United States)
Josei manga
2007 manga
Romance anime and manga
Ohzora Publishing manga